Hassan Jamal El Mohamad (born 24 August 1988) is a Lebanese former footballer who played as a forward.

Early life 
El Mohamad was born on 24 August 1988 in Lagos, Nigeria, to Lebanese parents. His father was a Lebanese who played football professionally in Nigeria as a striker; he was one of the very few Lebanese footballers to have played in the African country. El Mohamad and his family then emigrated to Lebanon, settling in their hometown Jwaya in the South Governorate. El Mohamad played football for the local club, attracting the attention of various scouts.

Club career 
In 2005, aged 17, El Mohamad signed for Lebanese Premier League side Rayyan, without, however, playing any game in the first season. The following season, in 2006–07, El Mohamad debuted for the team in the Lebanese top flight; he was awarded the 2006–07 Lebanese Young Player of the Year. Following Rayyan's relegation to the Second Division, El Mohamad joined Ahli Saida for the 2007–08 season.

After a two-year break from football, El Mohamad joined Irshad in 2010. The following year, in 2011, El Mohamad joined Nejmeh under coach Moussa Hojeij. In 2014 El Mohamad joined Malaysian side Sarawak; however, following an injury to the ankle, El Mohamad returned to Lebanon to receive treatment. The same year, he re-joined Nejmeh.

In 2019, after nine years at Nejmeh, El Mohamad joined Akhaa Ahli Aley. On 6 September 2020, El Mohamad joined Safa. On 17 November 2020, El Mohamad announced his retirement from football aged 32.

Personal life 
El Mohamad's favourite player worldwide is Lionel Messi, while his preferred Lebanese player is Hassan Maatouk. His favourite club is English side Manchester United.

Honours 
Nejmeh
 Lebanese Premier League: 2013–14
 Lebanese FA Cup: 2015–16

Individual
 Lebanese Premier League Best Young Player: 2006–07
 Lebanese Premier League Team of the Season: 2012–13

See also
 List of Lebanon international footballers born outside Lebanon

References

External links 

 
 
 
 
 
 

1988 births
Living people
Sportspeople from Lagos
Lebanese footballers
Association football forwards
Al Rayyan SC Beirut players
Al Ahli Saida SC players
Al Irshad SC players
Nejmeh SC players
Sarawak FA players
Akhaa Ahli Aley FC players
Safa SC players
Lebanese Premier League players
Malaysia Premier League players
Lebanon international footballers
Lebanese expatriate footballers
Expatriate footballers in Malaysia
Lebanese expatriate sportspeople in Malaysia